"I Like You (A Happier Song)" is a song by American rapper and singer Post Malone featuring fellow American rapper and singer Doja Cat. The song was written by the artists alongside Billy Walsh and producers Louis Bell and Jasper Harris. It was sent to US contemporary hit radio as the third single from Malone's fourth studio album, Twelve Carat Toothache, on June 3, 2022. The song reached number three on the Billboard Hot 100, giving Malone his eleventh top-10 hit on the chart and Doja Cat her sixth. It was also nominated for  Best Pop Duo/Group Performance at the 2023 Grammy Awards.

Critical reception
Ben Devlin of MusicOMH praised the chemistry between Post Malone and Doja Cat on the song. Conversely, Robin Murray of Clash said that "Doja Cat seems wasted on the frothy 'I Like You (A Happier Song)'".

Writing for Billboard, Lyndsey Havens ranked it the third best song on Twelve Carat Toothache, noting it "impossible not to smile" at its titular lyric, "I like you, I do," further going on to praise Doja Cat's verse and harmonies which make the song "sweeter."

Commercial performance
Following the release of Twelve Carat Toothache, "I Like You (A Happier Song)" debuted at number nine on the Billboard Hot 100. The song later peaked at number three in its 16th week on the chart. It was the most successful release from the album, as well as Post Malone's highest-charting single since "Circles".

Music video
The music video was released on July 26, 2022. As of March 2023, the music video has received over 77 million views.

Charts

Weekly charts

Year-end charts

Certifications

Release history

References

2022 singles
2022 songs
Post Malone songs
Songs written by Post Malone
Doja Cat songs
Songs written by Doja Cat
Songs written by Louis Bell
Song recordings produced by Louis Bell
Republic Records singles
Mercury Records singles